Jaksice  is a village in the administrative district of Gmina Inowrocław, within Inowrocław County, Kuyavian-Pomeranian Voivodeship, in north-central Poland.

The village has a population of 1,200.

References

Jaksice